Pike Station is an unincorporated community in Pike County, Illinois, United States. Pike Station is located on the Mississippi River and U.S. Route 54 across from the city of Louisiana, Missouri.

References

Unincorporated communities in Pike County, Illinois
Unincorporated communities in Illinois